Rapides Parish is a parish located in the U.S. state of Louisiana. As of the 2020 census, the population was 130,023. The parish seat is Alexandria, which developed along the Red River of the South. Rapides is the French word for "rapids". The parish was created in 1807 after the United States acquired this territory in the Louisiana Purchase.

Rapides Parish is included in the Alexandria metropolitan area, Louisiana.

History

In 1763, the land that is now Rapides Parish became the new home of the Apalachee tribe, who were settled there with the permission of Governor Kerlerec. Some Native Americans had come after fleeing the British and their Creek Indian allies from what is now Leon County, Florida. Many of their descendants remain in Natchitoches Parish.

The first French settler was Vincent Porei, who was granted a small tract of land in July 1764 by the Civil and Military Commander of Natchitoches. Nicolas Etienne Marafret Layssard arrived in December 1766, with the permission of Aubrey and Foucault, to establish a "tar works" in the pineries of Rapides, for naval stores.  He was later appointed the first Civil Commander of Rapides Parish. During the 1760s, the area was still a dependency of Natchitoches Parish [AGI, PPC, Legajo 187a, 384-384v].

Parts of Catahoula Parish, Grant Parish, Vernon Parish, and Winn Parish were initially part of Rapides Parish territory, but they eventually separated and obtained land from neighboring parishes.

21st-century politics
Since the late 20th century, conservative whites have mostly shifted from the Democratic Party, long in control in Louisiana and other Deep South states, to the Republican Party. The population of Alexandria is heavily Democratic, but voters in the white-majority Rapides Parish frequently favor Republican candidates in competitive presidential elections. In 2012, Republican Mitt Romney carried the parish with 37,193 votes (64.1 percent), compared to Democrat U.S. President Barack Obama's 20,045 (34.6 percent) tabulation. The 2008 returns in Rapides Parish were similar to those of 2012. U.S. Senator John McCain of Arizona won the parish with 36,611 votes (63.6 percent) to President Obama's 20,127 (35 percent).

With 58.8 percent and 63.8 percent, respectively, George W. Bush carried Rapides Parish in both 2000 and 2004 over the Democrats, Vice President Al Gore and John F. Kerry. The last Democrat to win at the presidential level in Rapides Parish was Bill Clinton, who in 1996 received 23,004 votes (46.1 percent) to Robert J. Dole's 21,548 (43.2 percent). Ross Perot, founder of his Reform Party, received 4,670 ballots (9.4 percent).

Geography
It is the largest parish in Louisiana by land area.

Water features
 Catahoula Lake
 Red River

Major highways
  Interstate 49
  U.S. Highway 71
  U.S. Highway 165
  U.S. Highway 167
  Louisiana Highway 1
  Louisiana Highway 28

Adjacent parishes
 Grant Parish  (north)
 La Salle Parish  (northeast)
 Avoyelles Parish  (east)
 Evangeline Parish  (southeast)
 Allen Parish  (southwest)
 Vernon Parish  (west)
 Natchitoches Parish  (northwest)

National protected area
 Kisatchie National Forest (part)

Military installations
 Camp Beauregard (LA Army National Guard)
 Esler Airfield (LA Army National Guard)
 England Air Force Base (defunct)
 Camp Claiborne (defunct)
 Camp Livingston (defunct)

National Guard
 225th Engineer Brigade

Demographics

2020 census

As of the 2020 United States census, there were 130,023 people, 48,975 households, and 32,667 families residing in the parish.

2010 census
As of the 2010 United States Census, there were 131,613 people living in the parish. 63.3% were White, 25.0% Black or African American, 1.83% Asian, 2.15% Native American, 1.56% of some other race and 1.88% of two or more races. 6.85% were Hispanic or Latino (of any race).

2000 census
As of the census of 2000, there were 126,337 people, 47,120 households, and 33,125 families living in the parish. There were 52,038 housing units at an average density of 39 per square mile (15/km2). The racial makeup of the parish was 66.51% White, 30.43% Black or African American, 0.74% Native American, 0.86% Asian, 0.04% Pacific Islander, 0.42% from other races, and 1.01% from two or more races.  1.38% of the population were Hispanic or Latino of any race.

There were 47,120 households, out of which 34.60% had children under the age of 18 living with them, 49.70% were married couples living together, 16.80% had a female householder with no husband present, and 29.70% were non-families. 26.00% of all households were made up of individuals, and 10.30% had someone living alone who was 65 years of age or older.  The average household size was 2.56 and the average family size was 3.09.

In the parish the population was spread out, with 27.20% under the age of 18, 9.50% from 18 to 24, 27.90% from 25 to 44, 22.40% from 45 to 64, and 13.10% who were 65 years of age or older.  The median age was 36 years. For every 100 females, there were 91.70 males.  For every 100 females age 18 and over, there were 88.00 males.

The median income for a household in the parish was $29,856, and the median income for a family was $36,671. Males had a median income of $29,775 versus $20,483 for females. The per capita income for the parish was $16,088.  About 16.40% of families and 20.50% of the population were below the poverty line, including 26.30% of those under age 18 and 16.30% of those age 65 or over.

Government and infrastructure
The Louisiana Department of Public Safety & Corrections formerly operated the J. Levy Dabadie Correctional Center on property adjacent to Camp Beauregard in Pineville in Rapides Parish. The facility  closed in July 2012.

Rapides Parish is solidly Republican in presidential elections. In 2016, Hillary Clinton suffered the worst defeat for a Democratic candidate in the county since Walter Mondale in 1984, Although her husband, Bill, won the parish in 1996 during his reelection bid, this stands as the last time Rapides Parish voted for a Democratic candidate.

Education
Rapides Parish School Board operates public schools.

Communities

Cities
 Alexandria (parish seat and largest municipality)
 Pineville

Towns
 Ball
 Boyce
 Cheneyville
 Glenmora
 Lecompte
 Woodworth

Villages
 Forest Hill
 McNary

Unincorporated areas

Census-designated Place 
 Deville

Unincorporated communities 

 Buckeye
 Clifton
 Echo
 Elmer
 Flatwoods
 Gardner
 Hineston
 Kolin
 Lena
 Libuse
 Melder
 Otis
 Sieper
 Tioga

Gallery

See also

 National Register of Historic Places listings in Rapides Parish, Louisiana
 Jay Chevalier
 Bill Cleveland
Palustris Experimental Forest

References

External links

 Rapides Parish Government's Website
 Rapides Parish Sheriff's Office

Geology
 Snead, J., P. V. Heinrich, and R. P. McCulloh, 2002, Ville Platte 30 x 60 minute geologic quadrangle. Louisiana Geological Survey, Baton Rouge, Louisiana.

 
Louisiana parishes
Alexandria metropolitan area, Louisiana
1807 establishments in the Territory of Orleans
Populated places established in 1807